Anjengo was launched in 1802. At the time she was the largest vessel built at Anjengo. Her ultimate fate is currently unknown.

She had as a figurehead a carving of Diana the Huntress.

Notes, citations, and references
Notes

Citations

References
Reports and Papers on the Impolicy of Employing Indian Built Ships in the Trade of the East-India Company, and of Admitting Them to British Registry: With Observation on Its Injurious Consequences to the Landed and Shipping Interests, and to the Numerous Branches of Trade Dependent on the Building and Equipment of British-built Ships (1809), (Blacks and Parry). 
 

1802 ships
British ships built in India
Age of Sail merchant ships of England